Koshguiyeh (also Romanized as Koshgū’īyeh; also known as Kashkoo’eyeh, Kashkū’īyeh, Kashkū’īyeh-ye Balūrd, and Koshkū’īyeh) is a village in Balvard Rural District, in the Central District of Sirjan County, Kerman Province, Iran. At the 2006 census, its population was 193, in 50 families.

References 

Populated places in Sirjan County